A list of films produced by the Marathi language film industry based in Maharashtra in the year 1958.

1958 Releases
A list of Marathi films released in 1958.

References

Lists of 1958 films by country or language
 Marathi
1958